The  is a railway line in Chiba Prefecture, Japan, owned and operated by East Japan Railway Company (JR East). It connects Ōami Station in the city of Ōamishirasato and Narutō Station in the city of Sanmu.

Services
Every morning, a commuter rapid train (rapid on weekends and holidays) runs from Narutō to Tokyo Station via the Sotobō and Keiyō lines. Every evening, a commuter rapid train (Again, rapid on weekends and holidays) runs from Tokyo to Narutō via the same route as the one in the morning.

Station list
 All stations are located in Chiba Prefecture.
 Rapid and commuter rapid trains stop at all stations on the Tōgane Line.
 Trains can pass each other at stations marked "◇", "∨", "∧"; they cannot pass each other at stations marked "｜".

Rolling stock
209-2000/2100 series EMUs
E233-5000 series 4-car EMUs (Keiyō Line through services)

Past
 113 series EMUs
211 series EMUs

History
The Boso Railway Co. opened the Oami - Togane section in 1900, and was nationalised in 1907.

JGR opened the Togane - Naruto section in 1911.

The line was electrified (at 1,500 V DC overhead) from 1 October 1973, CTC signalling was commissioned the following year, and freight services ceased in 1999.

Former connecting lines
 Togane station - The Kujukuri Railway Co. operated a   gauge line to Kazusa Katakai between 1926 and 1961.

References

External links

 Stations of the Tōgane Line (JR East) 

 
Lines of East Japan Railway Company
Railway lines in Chiba Prefecture
1067 mm gauge railways in Japan
Railway lines opened in 1900